Anita Peabody (1925–1934) was an American Champion Thoroughbred racehorse. Bred and raced by John and Fannie Hertz, she was born at their Leona Farm near Cary, Illinois. She was named after the wife of Stuyvesant Peabody, then President of the Illinois Turf Association.  Anita Peabody's sire was Luke McLuke, winner of the 1914 Belmont Stakes and a son of the important but unraced Ultimus, who had been sired by Commando. Anita Peabody's dam was La Dauphine, a daughter of The Tetrarch, who was voted Britain's greatest two-year-old of the 20th century.

Trained by Bert Michell, in 1927, Anita Peabody won six of her seven starts as a two-year-old and has been retrospectively voted American Champion Two-Year-Old Filly honors.  Her biggest win that year came  with a victory over colts in the Belmont Futurity Stakes. In August 1928, at age three, she was retired because of injuries, having won one race that year.

Consigned to broodmare duty at Leona Farm, in February 1931 she gave birth to a son of the Hertz's star runner, Reigh Count, who later would sire 1943 U.S. Triple Crown champion, Count Fleet.

Anita Peabody died unexpectedly of an infection at Leona Farm on August 27, 1934, having produced three foals.

References

 July 5, 1927 Chicago Daily Tribune article titled Anita Peabody wins Joliet Stakes before 30,000
 September 18, 1927 New York Times article titled Anita Peabody First in $100,000 Futurity
 August 28, 1934 New York Times article on the death of Anita Peabody

1925 racehorse births
1934 racehorse deaths
Thoroughbred family 31
Racehorses bred in Illinois
Racehorses trained in the United States
American Champion racehorses